Chiavazza is a frazione (parish) of the municipality of Biella, in Piedmont, northern Italt.

Overview
Chiavazza is a borough located in the eastern sector of the city, to which it is connected by a bridge above the Cervo River, and was once a separate commune. It is crossed by the Via Milano, which connects Biella to Vigliano Biellese. Along the road are numerous villas, including the Villa Mosca, surrounded by a lavish 18th century-style garden.

References 

Frazioni of Biella
Former municipalities of the Province of Biella